Stan Lazaridis (born 16 August 1972) is an Australian former footballer. He was predominantly a left winger though he had been known to perform at left back. He last played for his home-town club Perth Glory and made 58 official appearances for Australia and was in the Australian 2006 FIFA World Cup squad.

Club career
His reputation as a young left-footed teenager began with Olympic Kingsway where, despite his age, he intimidated many a defender with his change of pace.

Lazaridis made his senior debut for West Adelaide Hellas in the Australian National Soccer League in the 1992 season. His dribbling ability and pace drew much attention on the Australian scene. At the end of the 1995 season he earned a move to Europe when West Ham manager Harry Redknapp encountered Lazaridis playing for West Adelaide during West Ham's pre-season tour of Australia in May, 1995. Signed for £300,000 a poor debut and consistent injury problems made his debut season difficult when he made only six appearances. He scored his first goal for West Ham in a 1–1 away draw with Wimbledon on 18 March 1997.
Over four seasons, Lazaridis played just 87 games for West Ham United and scored three goals. In 1999, he dropped a division to sign for Birmingham City when manager Trevor Francis signed him in a deal worth an eventual £1.7million. Settling much better at St Andrew's, he played an important role in guiding the team up to the Premiership for the 2002–03 season, scoring one of the penalties in the play-off final shootout to help them get promoted to the Premier League. While at Birmingham he played in the 2001 Football League Cup Final.

Following promotion (and despite a raft of new signings) Lazaridis remained a regular player for the Blues, scoring the winner against local rivals Aston Villa in March 2003 and a classic goal against Everton in February 2004. After seven successful years at Birmingham City, in which he had become a fan favourite, Lazaridis was released at the end of the 2005–06 season after making 222 appearances for the club. He then looked to finish his career in Australia with A-League club Perth Glory.

Lazaridis made only 11 appearances for the Perth club in 2006–07. His time there was tainted when in January 2007, Lazaridis returned a positive drug test for anti-androgen Finasteride, a prescription alopecia medication, which was banned at the time.  Although perhaps slim comfort to Lazaridis finasteride was removed from the banned list in large measure as a result of the widespread discontent that followed his unfortunate case becoming public.

While noting his previous good character and making clear there was no evidence he had taken performance-enhancing drugs, he was found to have breached the rules and was given a 12-month suspension from football, mostly backdated. In March 2008, Perth Glory manager David Mitchell cut Lazaridis from the club's A-League roster, prompting the player to retire.

International career

Career statistics

Club

1Includes National Soccer League finals, FA Cup, Football League Cup and A-League Pre-Season Challenge Cup matches.

International

Honours 
Australia
 FIFA Confederations Cup runners-up: 1997
 OFC Nations Cup: 2000

Birmingham City
 Football League Cup runners-up: 2000–01
 Football League First Division play-off winners: 2001–02

References

External links
 
 Oz Football profile
 West Ham United statistics
 Football Database profile

1972 births
Living people
Soccer players from Perth, Western Australia
Australian people of Greek descent
Australian soccer players
Australian expatriate soccer players
Australia international soccer players
Olympic soccer players of Australia
A-League Men players
Premier League players
English Football League players
Birmingham City F.C. players
Perth Glory FC players
West Adelaide SC players
West Ham United F.C. players
Doping cases in association football
National Soccer League (Australia) players
Australian sportspeople in doping cases
Doping cases in Australian soccer
Floreat Athena FC players
Association football wingers
Marquee players (A-League Men)
1997 FIFA Confederations Cup players
2000 OFC Nations Cup players
Footballers at the 2000 Summer Olympics
2001 FIFA Confederations Cup players
2004 OFC Nations Cup players
2006 FIFA World Cup players
Expatriate footballers in England
Australian expatriate sportspeople in England